Reem bint al-Waleed bin Talal (born 7 March 1983) is a Saudi royal and businesswoman.

Princess Reem was born in Riyadh on 7 March 1983, the daughter of Al Waleed bin Talal Al Saud and Dalal bint Saud Al Saud. Reem is one of the most prominent Saudi social-media personalities, and is sometimes known as the "Kim Kardashian of Saudi Arabia" due to their perceived similar physical appearances and business endeavours. She often wears Western-style clothing, which has drawn criticism. 

Reem married fellow Saudi royal Abdulaziz bin Musaed in 2007. Together, they have three daughters. In 2016, Reem was featured as one of the sovereign artists at the ArtBahrain Royal Bridges event in Dubai. Reem was arrested on 9 November 2017 as part of the 2017–2019 Saudi Arabian purge, following the arrest of her father. She was the first woman of the royal family to be arrested during the purge.

References 

Living people
1983 births
20th-century Saudi Arabian businesspeople
20th-century Saudi Arabian women
21st-century Saudi Arabian businesspeople
21st-century Saudi Arabian women
Saudi Arabian princesses
Saudi Arabian women in business